Drosato is a village and a community in the Kilkis regional unit,  northern Greece. Drosato was the seat of the former municipality of Doirani. The community Drosato consists of the villages Drosato, Doirani and Koryfi.

Geography

Drosato is located 4 km southeast of Lake Doirani, 4 km from the border with the Republic of North Macedonia and 20 km north of Kilkis. The Greek National Road 65 (Kilkis - Sidirokastro) passes by the village. There are low hills to the east.

Population

External links
 Drosato on GTP Travel Pages

See also

List of settlements in the Kilkis regional unit

References

Populated places in Kilkis (regional unit)